António Baltasar Marcelino (21 September 1930 – 9 October 2013) was a Portuguese Bishop of the Roman Catholic Diocese of Aveiro.

Marcelino was born on 21 September 1930 in Castelo Branco, Portugal. He was ordained on 9 June 1955, was named bishop in 1975, and retired in 2006.

Marcelino died of an undisclosed disease on 9 October 2013, aged 83, at a hospital in Aveiro.

References

1930 births
People from Castelo Branco, Portugal
2013 deaths
20th-century Roman Catholic bishops in Portugal
21st-century Roman Catholic bishops in Portugal